Apagado (Spanish for Extinct, also known as Hualiaque) is a pyroclastic cone with scattered vegetation cover. Apagado has a nearly intact summit crater.

See also 
 List of volcanoes in Chile

References

External links
 SI Google Earth Placemarks - Smithsonian Institution Global Volcanism Program: download placemarks with SI  Holocene volcano-data.

Pyroclastic cones
Mountains of Chile
Volcanoes of Los Lagos Region
VEI-4 volcanoes